Eka Malaka Pethi (Petals of Desire) is a 2006 Sri Lankan Sinhala drama romantic film directed by Mohan Niyaz and produced by Jagath Wijenayake for Silumina Films. It stars popular singer Nalin Perera in debut acting, with another popular female singer Reema Ginger in lead roles along with Roshan Pilapitiya and Rex Kodippili. Music co-composed by Rookantha Gunathilake, Nalin Perera and Kasun Kalhara. It is the 1165th Sri Lankan film in the Sinhala cinema.

Plot

Cast
 Nalin Perera as Mahela Wijenayake
 Reema Ginger as Nirasha
 Roshan Pilapitiya as Arun Basnayake
 Rex Kodippili as Mahela's father
 Manel Wanaguru as Arun's mother
 Gnananga Gunawardena as Arun's father
 Maureen Charuni as Mahela's mother
 Buddhika Jayaratne as Kuma
 Anarkali Akarsha as Taniya
 Manel Wanaguru

References

2006 films
2000s Sinhala-language films
2006 romantic drama films
Sri Lankan romantic drama films